The Philippine Air Force Football Club is a Filipino professional football club whose original players were officers, enlisted personnel, and civilians of the Philippine Air Force. The club last competed in the Philippines Football League, the top tier of football in the Philippines.

Founded in 1960, Philippine Air Force has won several trophies including four national championships in the 1980s and 1990s. PAF has also participated in the Asian Club Championship and the Asian Cup Winners' Cup.

Philippine Air Force were one of the founding members of the United Football League (UFL), which was the de facto top flight of Philippine football back then. They won the inaugural UFL Cup in 2009 and went on to win the inaugural season of the UFL in 2010, becoming the first Filipino club to win the double. They won their second UFL title in 2011, and their second UFL cup in the following season. However, the club finished last in the 2013 season and were relegated to Division 2. They failed to earn promotion back to the top flight and eventually withdrew from the UFL after the 2014 season. After years of inactivity, Philippine Air Force joined the short-lived top-flight Philippine Premier League (PPL) in 2019. After the PPL folded with just a single match day, Air Force were absorbed into the revived Philippines Football League.

History

Early years
Historically, Philippine Air Force have been one of the most successful football clubs in the Philippines. The Air Force Team started way back in the 60s, along with the other armed forces teams in the Philippines –  the Philippine Army and Philippine Navy football clubs. For the longest time, the various football teams of the Armed Forces of the Philippines were the best clubs in the country. They are the so-called "big three" of Philippine football. For three decades(the 1980s, 1990s, 2000s and the early 2010s), they have dominated the Philippine club footballing landscape, they won most of the major football tournaments in the country during that period. During the absence of a real professional football league, the armed forces teams were a means for many talented local footballers to extend their careers as they were feeders for the national team.

Philippine Air Force first got promoted to the First Division in 1971, beating Araneta U in their Promotion playoff match during the 1970–71 PFA Cup major soccer series.

Glory years (1977–1993)
Philippine Air Force dethroned San Miguel Corp. Braves as the strongest team in the land in 1977. The Airmen were led by the swift forward Roberto Benavides, nicknamed Beep-beep Bitoy after a cartoon character, playmaker Polly Arenal and rugged defenders led by Eddie Dumago, Conrado Tolentino, Pepsi dela Cruz and Pancho Zulla plus gusty goalkeeper Noe Doctora. Benavides was instrumental in starting the Air Force's championship tradition in the 1970s along with Doctora and de la Cruz, they lead Philippine Air force team's first championships, when the Airmen won back-to-back Lobregat Cup titles in 1977 and 1978. Since then, the Airmen have been a force to reckon with in local competitions.  The Philippine Air Force team in the 80s was managed by Lopi Pascual who later on became the Philippine Football Federation President. San Miguel pirated some of the Air Force players but Pascual and coach Bertie Guanzon, always looking for talent, found Elmer "Lacknet" Bedia, who scored the winning goal that stunned San Miguel in the 1979 National Cup at Ugarte Field in Makati. During the 1980 National League, Air Force was suspended for one year after a brawl with E Razon Inc.

As the economic recession hit in 1983, commercial teams folded, the military upon Pascual's urging, recruited top players to sustain competition. The military's presence along with the later Coke Go For Goal Program sustained football. The Air Force squad, reigned in the National Men's Open Championship five times in the '80s and '90s.

The club participated in the 1993–94 edition of Asian Cup Winners' Cup as the sole representative of the Philippines. The club, which qualified to the tournament as winners of the Ugarte Cup, was led by head coach Noel Casilao. They lose in the two legged match against Japanese side Nissan with an aggregated score of 0–6. Their first match against the Japanese club was held in Japan where they lost 0–5.

The Airmen during the sporadic years of the country's club football history(1995–2008)
There was the P-League that ran for three years in the late 1990s. The first one was held in Manila where it failed for the lack of interest. It was moved later on to Davao then Dumaguete where it played to packed crowds. But the lack of funds and corporate support eventually killed the fledging league.

The Airmen, then called the Eagles, also won the only edition of the Manila Premier Football League in 1997, beating the Philippine Army Tamaraws for the title. The only season of the semi-professional Manila Premier Football League was contested by eight clubs, namely Air Force Hawks, Army Tamaraws, Navy Dolphins FC, Alabang United, España United ("Tigers"), Loyola FC ("Falcons"), Mendiola United and Taft FC.

In 1999, during the second P-League relaunched, 15 teams participated and played in Dumaguete. NCR-B consisted of Navy and Air Force players, beat Davao in the final to win the title in the 3rd P-League edition.

In 2001 during the Army-Utilco Invitational Football Cup(1st edition) Air Force FC beat Navy FC, 5–1 in their Third place match. Also during that year, Air Force pull off an exciting 2–1 victory over Navy to capture the Third Globe Super Cup football crown. The Airmen soared and banked on the heroics of national player Yanti Barsales in bagging the championship on top of the top cash prize of ₱50,000. During that Globe Super Cup finals, Barsales receiving a 35-yard pass from a direct free kick by teammate Edsel Bracamonte, the enterprising striker booted in the marginal goal in the 75th minute from pointblank following a goalmouth scramble to seal the Seamen's fate.

In 2002, Philippine Air Force FC representing NCR loss in the PFF National Cup Finals 2–1, to a Negros Occidental FA representative team 2–1.

In 2003, Philippine Air Force FC avenge their loss to the Negros Occidental FA representative team, beating West Negros College – A 1–0 in the Adidas Lightning Football National Finals held in University of St. La Salle Football Field in Bacolod.

The Air Force did not join the Filipino Premier League in 2008, opting to stay at the Terry Razon Cup which not only was similar to the FPL but had more teams with eleven. The PFF declared the teams that played in the Terry Razon Cup could not play in the FPL (although the NCRFA which ran the Razon Cup allowed teams to crossover). Rival Philippine Army, won the only edition of the Filipino Premier League.

Philippine Air Force in the United Football League (2010–2014)
Air Force which has carried the cudgels for the military squads after the decline of Navy, has won United Football League Division 1 title in 2010 and 2011. They also won the cup competition albeit by the skin of their teeth, winning the United Football League Cup crown in 2009 and 2011. Chieffy Caligdong and fellow Azkals veterans Yanti Bersales and Ian Araneta had continued the Air Force's championship tradition in recent years as they led PAF to its two UFL league titles and two United Football League Cup crowns. Philippine Air Force is one of the most successful club in the United Football League having won 2 league championships and 2 UFL Cup trophies. The club's most recent success was its 2011 Campaign which saw it as the Cup and League Champions in the UFL.

A period of rapid decline and inactivity(2012–2017)
When Air Force defeated the national team player-laden Loyola 2–0 during the 2011 UFL Cup Finals, Edmundo Mercado Jr., adjudged the best goalkeeper of the tournament, defiantly and somewhat controversially proclaimed his side as "true Filipinos". The statement was borne about the rapid changes to the game on local soil what with the influx of foreign talent that has taken the shine of the homegrown player. In the light of the rapid changes of the beautiful game in the Philippines where Fil-foreigners and foreign players have taken the club scene by storm, the football teams of Air Force, Army, and Navy, have somewhat, went through a period of rapid decline.

During the 2012 UFL Season opening day, they were thoroughly outplayed by Kaya and the 1-nil final score hardly begins to tell that story. One week earlier, the Airmen were handed their butts by visiting Internacional de Madrid in a friendly match. Air Force was crater bombed 10-nil by the third division Spanish side.

In 2013 season, Philippine Air Force FC finished last in the Division 1 table and has been relegated to UFL Division 2 in 2014 season.

During the 2014 UFL Division 2 season, Philippine Air Force where third-place, but withdrawn its participation in the UFL in the following season. The club enter a period of inactivity for the next four years.

Return to domestic football
The Philippine Air Force returns to domestic league football in 2019. They joined the short-lived Philippine Premier League (PPL) but their eligibility to participate in the league was put to question when they Philippine Football Federation (PFF) initially denied to give them a license to participate in any competitions sanctioned by the national football association. They participated in a match against Mendiola as part of the PPL despite the PFF not allowing their inclusion in the PPL which only had one match day before the PFF withdrew their sanction of the league due to management issues. The PFF decided to revive the Philippines Football League (PFL) which is set to commence in mid-May 2019.

Their licensing issues were resolved after the PFF gave them along with Mendiola provisional club license, allowing them to participate in the 2019 PFL season. They considered naming the Aboitiz field in Lipa, Batangas as their home venue but decided to go for Cebu City instead.

After three-year break, they announced the latest return for the 2023 Copa Paulino Alcantara.

Crest history

Kit manufacturers and shirt sponsors

Kit evolution

Coaches
  Bertie Guanzon (1970s–1980s)
  Col.Lope Q. Pascual (1980s)
  Noel Casilao (1990s)
  Oscar Rabena (?-2011)
  Sgt.Edzel Bracamonte (2011–2013)
  Leo Alfred Jaena (2013–present)

Current squad

Notable players 

 Mariano Araneta
 Elmer Bedia
 Rodolfo Alicante
 Raymund Tonog
 Ian Araneta
 Emelio Caligdong

Honors

Domestic competitions

League
 National League:
 Winners (1) : 1982

 Manila Premier Football League:
 Winners (1) : 1997

United Football League Division 1
 Winners (2) : 2010, 2011

Cups
 Lobregat Cup:
 Winners (2) : 1977, 1978

 National Cup Championships
 Winners (3): 1982–83, 1985, 1989

 Ugarte Cup:
 Winners (1): 1993

 Adidas Lightning Football National Tournament:
 Winners (1): 2003

UFL Cup
 Winners (2): 2009, 2011
 Runners-up (1): 2010

NCRFA tournaments
 NCR Open:
 Winners (2) 1982, 1983

 Globe Super Cup:
 Winners (1): 2001

Performance in AFC competitions

Asian Club Championship: 1 appearance
1989–1990: First round

Asian Cup Winners' Cup: 1 appearance
1993–1994: First round

Records

Key
 Tms. = Number of teams
 Pos. = Position in league
 Pro  = Promoted
 Rel  = Relegated
 TBD  = To be determined
 DNQ  = Did not qualify
Note: Performances of the club indicated here was after the UFL Division 1 created (as a semi-pro league) in 2009.

References

Football clubs in the Philippines
Sports teams in Metro Manila
Military sports clubs in the Philippines
Air Force
Football club